The Greenville Highway is the local road name used for the following highways
U.S. Route 29 in South Carolina in Greenville, South Carolina
U.S. Route 276 in North Carolina in Cedar Mountain, North Carolina.

Roads in North Carolina
Roads in South Carolina
U.S. Route 29